Kokava nad Rimavicou is a village and municipality in the Poltár District in the Banská Bystrica Region of Slovakia.  The village stands in the Stolica Mountains of the Inner Western Carpathians. Kokava in the past had been center for regional glass production. In the 20th century were established two paper mills, a potash workshop and a steam timber, although they went through a recession recently. Nearby holiday location Kokava-Línia offers several chalets and cottages used mainly by winter skiers.

Culture
Kokava is known for its festival tradition. In 2012 the folklore festival Koliesko (The Wheel) celebrated its 22nd anniversary. Additionally, there is annual country music festival Country fest Kokava and a festival of gypsy music Balvafest. Na Chorepe byva Havran, vtak. (bird, raven).

See also
 List of municipalities and towns in Slovakia

References

Genealogical resources
The records for genealogical research are available at the state archive "Statny Archiv in Banska Bystrica, Slovakia"

 Roman Catholic church records (births/marriages/deaths): 1804-1896 (parish A)
 Lutheran church records (births/marriages/deaths): 1837-1911 (parish A)
 Reformated church records (births/marriages/deaths): 1771-1896 (parish B)

External links
 
Official homepage
Folklore festival Koliesko information
Surnames of living people in Kokava nad Rimavicou

Villages and municipalities in Poltár District